Myrichthys breviceps (syn. M. acuminatus), the sharptail snake-eel, is a fish species native to the Western Atlantic.

It has diffuse, yellow spots on a blueish-gray back and white belly. Spots are small on the head, larger on the body. The eel occurs not uncommonly along the coasts of the Caribbean sea, on sea grass beds and on reefs. Although mainly night active, they may also be seen foraging during daylight. Food is small invertebrates like crabs.

They allow close approach by divers and can easily be photographed, but bury in the sand when bothered.

References

External links
 

Ophichthidae
Fish of the Caribbean
Fish described in 1848